Luis Alfonso Jiménez Jr. (July 30, 1940 – June 13, 2006) was an American sculptor of Mexican descent. Known for portraying Hispanic-American themes, his works have been displayed at the Smithsonian and at Denver International Airport.

Education
Born in El Paso, Texas, he worked at his father's neon sign studio as a child.

He studied art and architecture at the University of Texas in Austin and El Paso, earning a bachelor's degree in 1964. He moved to New York City in 1966 after completing his post-graduate work at Ciudad Universitaria, Mexico City, D.F.

He became an accomplished artist and taught art at the University of Arizona and later the University of Houston.

Artistry 
Jiménez was known for his large polychromed fiberglass sculptures usually of Southwestern and Hispanic themes. His works were often controversial and eminently recognizable because of their themes and the bright, colorful undulating surfaces that Jiménez employed.

Jiménez was influenced by the murals of José Clemente Orozco and Diego Rivera. He was very much a contemporary artist whose roots were in pop art, as much as they were in both the modernism of the Mexican muralists and the regionalism of Benton and Grant Wood. Heroic sculptures were Jiménez's forte, championing the common man in his work. Working in his father's shop, making neon signs, as well as lowrider car culture, and featuring brightly painted fiberglass bodywork, were also artistic influences.

Primarily a sculptor, he also created color lithographs and colored-pencil drawings. He would use preparatory drawings for his sculptures, which are made of fiberglass cast in a mold, then painted and coated with epoxy. One art expert has noted, "There was no surface on any Luis Jiménez sculpture that was ever any less than six different colors, each airbrushed separately adding a slightly different tone." Jiménez would also often use flake, that glittery quality often seen on lowrider cars, in his paint.

In 1993, Jiménez was a recipient of the New Mexico Governor's Awards for Excellence in the Arts. In 1998 he received a Distinguished Alumni award from the University of Texas in recognition of his artwork.

Health 
As a child, his left eye was shot by a BB gun. Surgeries corrected his vision, but he developed persistent migraines and got a glass eye later in life.

As a young adult teaching art at junior high school, he was temporarily paralyzed from the chest down in a car accident.

In his later years, he had a heart attack and required hand surgery.

Death
On June 13, 2006, Jiménez died in an accident at age 65 in his studio in Hondo, New Mexico, when a large section of his 32-foot-high work Blue Mustang, intended for Denver International Airport, came loose from a hoist and severed an artery in his leg.

Governor Bill Richardson ordered flags in New Mexico flown at half-staff June 15–16, 2006, in Jiménez's honor.

Family 
Jiménez's daughter Elisa is a multimedia artist and fashion designer and was a contestant on season four of Bravo's reality television series Project Runway.

Works
 Man on Fire, Smithsonian American Art Museum, Washington DC, 1969
 Progress I, Albuquerque Museum, New Mexico, 1974
Progress II, Blanton Museum of Art, Austin, Texas, 1976
 Vaquero, Moody Park, Houston, Texas, 1980
 Sodbuster, Wichita State university as part of the Ulrich Museum of art outdoor sculpture collection, 1980–81
Honky Tonk, Wichita State University as part of the Ulrich Museum, 1981
 Southwest Pieta, Longfellow Park, Albuquerque, New Mexico, 1983 (declared a national treasure by President Bill Clinton in 1999)
 Howl, Albuquerque Museum, New Mexico and Ulrich Museum of Art, Wichita State University, 1986
 Border Crossing/Cruzando el Rio Bravo, Santa Fe, New Mexico, Los Angeles, California, and Blanton Museum of Art, Austin, Texas, 1989
 Steelworker,  Birmingham Museum of Art, Birmingham, Alabama, 1990
Los Lagartos, Downtown, El Paso, Texas, 1993
 Fiesta Jarabe, University of New Mexico, Albuquerque, New Mexico, 1996
Assyrian Lion, Kalamazoo Institute of Arts, Kalamazoo, 2004
 Cleveland Fallen Firefighters Memorial, Cleveland, OH, 2006
 Blue Mustang, Denver International Airport, Denver, Colorado, 2008

Collections

 Albuquerque Museum, Albuquerque, New Mexico
 Anderson Museum of Contemporary Art, Roswell, New Mexico
 Arizona State University, Nelson Fine Arts Center Tempe, Arizona
 Art Museum of Southeast Texas Beaumont, Texas
 Jack S. Blanton Museum of Art, Austin, Texas
 Crystal Bridges Museum of American Art, Bentonville, AR
 Chazen Museum of Art, Madison, Wisconsin
 El Paso Museum of Art, El Paso, Texas
 Iowa State University, College of Family and Consumer Sciences, Ames, Iowa
 Kemper Museum of Contemporary Art, Kansas City, Missouri
 Long Beach Museum of Art, Long Beach, California
 McCarran International Airport, Las Vegas, Nevada
 New Mexico Museum of Art, Santa Fe, New Mexico
 Plains Art Museum, Fargo, North Dakota
 Roswell Museum and Art Center, Roswell, New Mexico
 Saint Louis University, St. Louis University Museum of Art, Saint Louis, Missouri
 Smithsonian American Art Museum, Washington, D.C.
 University of Arizona, Museum of Art, Tucson, Arizona
 University of Kansas, Helen Foresman Spencer Museum of Art, Lawrence, Kansas
 University of Oklahoma, Fred Jones Jr. Museum of Art, Norman, Oklahoma
 University of New Mexico, Albuquerque, New Mexico
 University of Texas at El Paso, Library, El Paso, Texas
 University of Texas at San Antonio, San Antonio, Texas
 Utah Valley University, Woodbury Art Museum Orem, Utah
 Valley National Bank of Arizona, Fine Arts Department, Phoenix, Arizona
 Wichita State University, Edwin A. Ulrich Museum of Art, Wichita, Kansas
 Spencer Museum of Art, Lawrence, Kansas
 Frost Art Museum, Miami, FL
 The Grace Museum, Abilene, Texas
 Mcnay Museum of Art, San Antonio, TX
 Ellen Noël Art Museum, Odessa, Texas
 The Sculpture Collection, Santa Monica, CA
 Otis College of Art and Design, Los Angeles
 Colorado Springs Fine Arts Center, Colorado Springs, CO
 Numerous private collections

See also

 History of the Mexican-Americans in Texas

References 

 Laguna Gloria Art Museum, Luis Jimenez, Austin, Texas: Laguna Gloria Art Museum, 1983
Landis, Moore, et al., "Man on Fire, Luis Jiménez, El Hombre en Llamas, The Albuquerque Museum, Albuquerque, New Mexico,  1994
McHenry, Deni McIntosh. Luis Jiménez: Working-Class Heroes: Images from the Popular Culture, Kansas City, Missouri: Mid-America Arts Alliance, 1997
Ramos, E. Carmen, "The Latino Presence in American Art," American Art 26 (Summer 2012): 7-13
 Storey, Natalie, Artist Dies in Studio Accident, The Santa Fe New Mexican, June 14, 2006, page 1

External links
 Stewart, Jocelyn Y. "Luis Jiménez Jr., 65; Artist Whose Sculptures Are on Public Display Nationwide," Los Angeles Times, Thursday, June 15, 2006.
 Smithsonian American Art Museum biography
 From the Fred Jones Jr. Museum of Art Image of Mesteño, smaller version of the sculpture that killed him.
 Johnson, Kirk. "And Behold a Big Blue Horse? Many in Denver Just Say Neigh," The New York Times, Monday, March 2, 2009.

1940 births
2006 deaths
American artists of Mexican descent
Artists from El Paso, Texas
University of Texas at El Paso alumni
University of Texas at Austin School of Architecture alumni
University of Houston faculty
University of Arizona faculty
Sculptors from Texas
20th-century American sculptors
20th-century American male artists
American male sculptors
Accidental deaths in New Mexico
20th-century American printmakers